Lee Su-jeong (Hangul: 이수정, born July 6, 1992), formerly known as  Baby Soul, is a South Korean singer and a member of South Korean girl group Lovelyz under Woollim Entertainment. She firstly released digital single with "Stranger" on November 23, 2011prior to debut as a member of girl group Lovelyz in November 2014.

Following Lovelyz's contract come to end and went hiatus in November 2021, Lee renew her contract with Woollim and began her solo career with her birth name Lee Su-jeong. Lee later released her debut EP My Name.

Career

2011–2013 : Pre-debut project

Lee made her first appearance as a featured singer in labelmate Infinite's debut studio album Over the Top on the song "Crying". She later made her debut as a soloist on November 26, 2011 under the stage name Babysoul with her first single "Stranger" featuring soloist Wheesung as a part of Woollim Entertainment first girlgroup pre-debut project. On January 18, 2012, Lee released her second single "She's a Flirt", a duet with fellow Woollim Entertainment trainee, Yoo Ji-a.

2014–2021 : Lovelyz

On November 12, 2014 Lee debuted as the leader of Woollim Entertainment first girlgroup Lovelyz. The group's debut studio album Girls' Invasion was officially released on November 17, along with its lead single titled "Candy Jelly Love".

On April 23, 2019, Lee released her solo single "A Piece of Moon" after previously performing it on Lovelyz's Lovelyz in Winterland 3 Concert back in February 2019.

On November 1, 2021, Woollim Entertainment announced all of Lovelyz members, except Baby Soul, had decided not to renew their contracts, which expired on November 16. However, Woollim Entertainment didn't mention in its press release sent to news agencies on whether the group would be disbanded. Later, Lee confirmed that although the members are signed under different agencies, they still have desire to promote and release albums together as Lovelyz in the near future. On November 17, Woolim Entertainment officially stated that Baby Soul has decided to begin using her given name Lee Su-jeong for her future promotions.

2022–present : Solo debut and solo activities
On April 19, 2022, it was announced that Lee would release her debut EP titled My Name on April 23 with the title track "Walking Through The Moon". Along with the release of her debut EP My Name, Lee held her first solo concert throughout the month of May for four weeks from May 5–19.

On December 19, 2022, Lee released "The Miracle of Christmas" a collaboration  with singer LEEWOO.

Discography

Extended plays

Singles

Songwriting credits

All song credits are adapted from the Korea Music Copyright Association's database unless stated otherwise.

References

1992 births
Living people